The  was an anti-aircraft gun used by the Imperial Japanese Army after World War I. The Type 14  number was designated for the year the gun was accepted, the  14th year of Emperor Taishō's reign, 1929 in the Gregorian calendar. Only a small number were produced, and it was superseded by the Type 88 75 mm AA gun in production before the start of World War II.

History and development
Due to combat experience at the Battle of Tsingtao against the German Luftstreitkrafte’s fledgling squadron of combat aircraft, planners on the Imperial Japanese Army General Staff quickly realized that this new technology posed a threat which required countermeasures. This evaluation was further reinforced by reports from military observers on the European front in World War I.

After the introduction of the Type 11 75 mm AA gun into front-line combat service, the Imperial Japanese Army quickly realized that it was underpowered and lacked the range necessary for civil defense of Japanese cities from enemy air raids. A larger version, designated the Type 14 10 cm AA gun was placed into production in 1925. However, it was expensive to produce and lacked accuracy. Only 70 units were completed before production was terminated.

Design
The Type 14 10 cm AA gun had a single piece gun barrel with a horizontal sliding breechblock, and a hydro-pneumatic recoil system mounted on a central pedestal. The firing platform was supported by six legs, each of which (along with the central pedestal) had adjustable screwed foot for leveling. The gun came with detachable wheels for transport, which were removed when in the firing position. Thirty to 45 minutes were required to prepare the gun for action.

Combat record
All of the Type 14 10 cm AA guns were assigned to the IJA 4th Anti-Aircraft Artillery Division, based in Kyūshū during the Pacific War. Some units were based in Kyūshū cities for defense against American air raids, but most were based at the Yawata Steel Works in Kitakyūshū city.

References
 Bishop, Chris (eds) The Encyclopedia of Weapons of World War II. Barnes & Nobel. 1998. 
 Chant, Chris. Artillery of World War II, Zenith Press, 2001, 
 McLean, Donald B. Japanese Artillery; Weapons and Tactics. Wickenburg, Ariz.: Normount Technical Publications 1973. .
 War Department TM-E-30-480 Handbook on Japanese Military Forces September 1944

External links
Taki's Imperial Japanese Army
 US Technical Manual E 30-480

Notes

Artillery of Japan
100 mm artillery
World War II anti-aircraft guns
1
1
Military equipment introduced in the 1920s